َQaida is an Arabic word which literally means "foundation". In English spelling, Qaida may refer to

 Qaida (book), a series of books for learning Quranic Arabic intended for beginners.
 Al-Qaeda, a militant organization blamed for the events of September 11, 2001.